Caroline was a ship launched in France in 1792, possibly under another name. She was taken in prize in 1794 and sailed first as a West Indiaman, then as a whaler, and finally as a slave ship. She was lost in 1801 on her second slave-trading voyage after she had delivered her slaves to Kingston, Jamaica.

Career
Caroline first appeared in Lloyd's Register (LR) in 1794.

Whaler: Samuel Enderby & Sons purchased Caroline in 1796 and sent her to whale in the British Southern Whale Fishery. Captain George Quested sailed in 1796, bound for the Pacific. In mid-1797 Caroline was at the Galapagos Islands. She returned to London on 21 October 1798.

Carolines ownership changed to Liverpool and she became a slave ship.

1st slave voyage (1799–1800): Captain William Findlay (or Finlay) acquired a letter of marque on 17 April 1799. He sailed for West Africa on 14 May 1799. Caroline gathered her slaves at Bonny and arrived at Kingston, Jamaica, 9 November with 426 slaves. She sailed from Kingston on 10 December and arrived back at Liverpool 27 January 1800. She had left Liverpool with 41 crew members and suffered three crew deaths on the voyage.

2nd slave voyage (1800–1801): Captain Findlay sailed from Liverpool on 6 May 1800, bound for West Africa. She left with 43 crew members. Caroline arrived at Kingston 302 slaves and 35 crew members. She suffered four crew deaths on her voyage.

Fate
On 2 February 1801 Caroline, Finlay, master, was lost at Jamaica. Her crew were saved, as were the mails. The packet  took the mails to Falmouth.

Caroline had developed a leak as she set out that immediately overwhelmed the pumps, forcing the crew to abandon her. Princess Amelia, Captain Bryant, sailed from Jamaica on 8 February and arrived at Falmouth on 22 March.

Citations

1792 ships
Ships built in France
Captured ships
Age of Sail merchant ships of England
Whaling ships
Liverpool slave ships
Maritime incidents in 1801
Shipwrecks in the Caribbean Sea